Ptiolina is a genus of snipe flies of the family Rhagionidae,. Examples are found in Northwest Europe, where it prefers woodlands areas. and North America 

Ptiolina species are delicate to fairly robust flies, and from 3 to 10 mm. They are entirely black or brown in colour.

Species
Ptiolina alapponica Makarkin & Sidorenko, 2001
Ptiolina alberta Leonard, 1931
Ptiolina angusta Curran, 1931
Ptiolina attenuata Nagatomi, 1986
Ptiolina dudai Lindner, 1942
Ptiolina edeta (Walker, 1849)
Ptiolina grandis Frey, 1918
Ptiolina latifrons Nagatomi, 1986
Ptiolina leleji Makarkin & Sidorenko, 2001
Ptiolina longipilosa Nagatomi, 1986
Ptiolina mallochi Hardy & McGuire, 1947
Ptiolina nagatomii Makarkin & Sidorenko, 2001
Ptiolina nervosa Nagatomi, 1986
Ptiolina nitida Wahlberg, 1854
Ptiolina nitidifrons Hardy & McGuire, 1947
Ptiolina obscura (Fallén, 1814) Black-fringe moss-snipefly
Ptiolina obsoleta Leonard, 1931
Ptiolina paradoxa (Jaennicke, 1867)
Ptiolina pelliticornis Becker, 1900
Ptiolina shimai Nagatomi, 1985
Ptiolina sphaeralis Nagatomi, 1986
Ptiolina vicina Hardy & McGuire, 1947
Ptiolina zonata Hardy & McGuire, 1947

References

Rhagionidae
Taxa named by Rasmus Carl Stæger
Diptera of Asia
Diptera of North America
Brachycera genera
Diptera of Europe
Articles containing video clips